Admiral Dewey, also known as Georgetown and today as Helen McAllister, is a  tugboat built in 1900  at the Burlee Drydock  in Port Richmond, New York.  She was built with a  triple expansion compound steam engine which was replaced with a diesel engine after World War II.  She towed coal barges to refuel ships in the harbor.   In 1955, she was sold to a Charleston, South Carolina tugboat company.  In the 1980s, the McAllister tugboat company of New York purchased the company and brought the renamed Helen McAllister back to New York harbor.  She helped dock tall ships during Op Sail 1992.

After retirement, she was donated to the South Street Seaport Museum in Manhattan in 2000. In 2012, Helen McAllister was returned to McAllister Towing. In 2021, Helen McAllister was moved to Tottenville on Staten Island and dismantled.

References

Ships on the National Register of Historic Places in Manhattan
South Street Seaport
1900 ships
Tugboats of the United States
Mariners Harbor, Staten Island